The Colne Brook is a river in England that is a distributary of the River Colne which runs from Uxbridge Moor, there forming the western border of Greater London, to the River Thames just below Bell Weir Lock in Hythe End, Wraysbury, Berkshire.

Course
On leaving the Colne at Uxbridge Moor in the Colne Valley regional park, the Colne Brook flows close by to its west until West Drayton then passes under the M25 motorway at the M4 "Thorney interchange", enters Berkshire and flows through the village of Colnbrook. South of there it receives some water from the Poyle Channel, after which that becomes the Wraysbury River watering the west of Staines Moor.  Then the Brook runs between Horton's centre and another residential part of Horton on Coppermill Road adjoining Wraysbury Reservoir. Colne Brook has its end stage in the easternmost parish of the Royal Borough of Windsor and Maidenhead. It passes Wraysbury railway station then adjoins gravel-extraction-made lakes of Wraysbury, a Site of Special Scientific Interest, before running into the River Thames: between the M25 Runnymede Bridge and Bell Weir Lock upstream.

See also
Tributaries of the River Thames
List of rivers of England

Notes and references
Notes 
  
References

1ColneBrook
Rivers of Berkshire
Rivers of Buckinghamshire